NPO 2 Extra is a 24-hour public television channel from the NPO, devoted to documentaries, art and culture. Most programmes are supplied by NTR, AVROTROS, BNNVARA, KRO-NCRV, EO and VPRO. Topics covered include art, film, dance, theatre, literature, jazz and classical music.

On 26 March 2018 NPO Cultura was renamed to NPO 2 Extra.

Logos and identities

References

External links 
 Official Website NPO 2 Extra

Television channels in the Netherlands
Television channels and stations established in 2006